Češnjice v Tuhinju (or Kerschstetten) is a village in the Tuhinj Valley in the Municipality of Kamnik in the Upper Carniola region of Slovenia.

Name
The name of the settlement was changed from Češnjice to Češnjice v Tuhinju in 1953. In the past the German name was Kerschdorf or Kerschstetten.

References

External links 

Češnjice v Tuhinju on Geopedia

Populated places in the Municipality of Kamnik